Felix Engelhardt (born 19 August 2000) is a German professional racing cyclist, who currently rides for UCI WorldTeam .

Career
At the 2021 Tour of the Alps Engelhardt won the red Sprints jersey for winning the most intermediate sprint points he did this by attacking and being in the breakaway during multiple stages.
In July 2022 during the 2022 European Road Championships Engelhardt rode the Under-23 Road race and attacked with 3 other riders on the final lap, they managed to stay away. Engelhardt contested the sprint and became the European champion.
On 8 August 2022 it was announced that Engelhardt would join  on a two year contract from 2023.

Major results
Sources:

2017
 3rd Time trial, National Junior Road Championships
 4th Overall Internationale Cottbuser Junioren-Etappenfahrt
2018
 3rd Overall Oberösterreich Juniorenrundfahrt
 5th Overall GP Général Patton
 7th Grand Prix Bob Jungels
 10th Overall Tour du Pays de Vaud
2021
 1st  Young rider classification, Oberösterreich Rundfahrt 
 1st  Sprints classification, Tour of the Alps
 2nd GP Kranj
 10th Trofeo Matteotti
2022
 1st  Road race, UEC European Under–23 Road Championships
 1st Stage 5 (TTT) Tour de l'Avenir
 2nd GP Vipava Valley & Crossborder Goriška
 3rd Trofeo Città di Meldola
 6th Overall Istrian Spring Trophy
 6th Overall Giro Ciclistico d'Italia
 10th Trofeo Banca Popolare di Vicenza
2023
 1st Per sempre Alfredo

References

External links

2000 births
Living people
German male cyclists